Rockingham County Schools is a public school district in Rockingham County in the U.S. state of North Carolina. John O. Stover III is the superintendent.

School board

Schools

Elementary schools

Middle schools

High schools

Others

Statistics

Demographics
(as of the 2012-2013 school year)

References

External links
 

Education in Rockingham County, North Carolina
School districts in North Carolina
School districts established in 1993